Xinjiuzhan railway station is a railway station of Changchun–Tumen Railway and Jiuzhan–Jiangmifeng Railway. The station is located in the Changyi District of Jilin, Jilin province, China.

See also
Changchun–Tumen Railway
Jiuzhan–Jiangmifeng Railway

References

Railway stations in Jilin